The Army Group Duke Albrecht or Army Group D was an Army Group of the German Army, which operated on the Western Front under command of Albrecht, Duke of Württemberg, between 7 March 1917 and 11 November 1918 during World War I.

Composition 
 German Armee-Abteilung A (Bruno von Mudra then Johannes von Eben)
 German Armee-Abteilung B (Erich von Gündell)
 German Armee-Abteilung C (Max von Boehn then ) : until 4 February 1918
 German 19th Army (Felix Graf von Bothmer then Karl von Fasbender) : from 4 February 1918

Sources
The Soldier's Burden
Die Deutschen Heeresgruppen im Ersten Weltkrieg
: Die deutschen Heeresgruppen Teil 1, Erster Weltkrieg

Albrecht
Military units and formations of Germany in World War I
Military units and formations established in 1917
Military units and formations disestablished in 1918